Trittau (West Low German: Trittow) is a municipality in Schleswig-Holstein, Germany, located 30 km east of Hamburg. It is the economical and administrative center of Amt Trittau, which is part of the Stormarn district. Other villages in the county are Grönwohld, Lütjensee, Großensee, Rausdorf and Grande.

Geography 
Trittau is located close to the Hahnheide forest. Nearby rivers are the river Aue and the river Bille. The county is abundant with small lakes.

History 
The Trittau village dates back to the 12th century. It was first mentioned in 1167 in a document of Duke Henry the Lion. In those days it was situated close to the Hamburg - Rostock and Hamburg - Lübeck trade routes.

The village then consisted of a Saxon part (Groß-Trittau) and a Wagrian part (Klein-Trittau). In 1326, a castle was built to defend the region and the trade route against the Scarpenberg knights from nearby Linau castle.

Personalities associated with the community 
 Joachim Heinrich Campe (1746-1818), enlightened educator, publicist and linguist
 Caroline Rudolphi (1753-1811), educator, poet, author, founded an institute for girls' education in Trittau
 Theodor Steltzer (1885-1967), politician (CDU), 1946-1947 introduced Minister President of Schleswig-Holstein
 Arno Surminski (1934-), writer, novel Kudenow or weep at strange waters
 Bernd Heinrich (1940-), professor of biology, spent his childhood as a refugee child with his family in a forest hut in the Hahnheide
 Jürgen Blin (1943-), boxer, lived during his career in Trittau
 Irmgard Riessen (1944-), theater and television actress, lives in Trittau

References

Stormarn (district)